The Ministry of Science, Technology and Innovation (MinCiencias) is the body of the National Government of Colombia for the management of public administration, rector of the sector and of the National Science System , Technology and Innovation (SNCTI), in charge of formulating, guiding, directing, coordinating, executing, implementing and controlling the State policy in this matter, in accordance with the development plans and programs, in accordance with Law 2237 of 2022, through which its creation was made official.

The Ministry of Sciences is headed by Minister Arturo Luis Luna Tapia, a biologist graduated from the University of Sucre.

Structure
The Ministry of Science, Technology and Innovation is made up of the Minister's Office, the advisory and support offices, two vice ministries and the general secretariat, as follows:Organigrama Minciencias</ref>

Minister of Science, Technology and Innovation
Vice Ministry of Knowledge, Innovation and Productivity
Knowledge Generation Department
Direction of Transfer and Use of Knowledge
Vice Ministry of Talent and Social Appropriation of Knowledge
Direction of Capabilities and Dissemination of the CTel
Direction of Vocations and Formation in CTel
General Secretary
Human Talent Department
Administrative and Financial Management

See also 
Colciencias

References

External links 
 

Government ministries of Colombia
Organisations based in Bogotá
Government of Colombia
Science and technology in Colombia
Colombia
2020 establishments in Colombia